The Dutch Automated Vehicle Initiative (DAVI) is a research and demonstration initiative developing automated vehicles for use on public roads. 

The project is special in that, besides simply making driverless cars, it also focuses on having the automated vehicles share information among each other. The aim is to have the cars helping to avoid traffic congestion, by reducing the safety distance between the cars (from 2 seconds drive distance now to just 0.5 seconds) and avoiding sudden traffic slow-downs (due to maneuvers undertaken by drivers).

References

Self-driving cars
Emerging technologies
Robotics